Palomar Mountain is an unincorporated community in San Diego County, California, United States.

Description
The community is located near the north-central edge of San Diego County within the Cleveland National Forest, southeast of the Palomar Mountain State Park and southwest of Palomar Mountain and the Palomar Observatory.

Climate
According to the Köppen Climate Classification system, Palomar Mountain has a warm-summer Mediterranean climate, abbreviated "Csa" on climate maps. Annual precipitation on the mountain averages about 30 inches (highly variable from year to year), mostly falling between October and March. Snow falls during cold winter storms. Summers are mostly dry, except for occasional thunderstorms in late July to early September. The humid climate supports woods of oak, pine, fir and cedar on large swaths of the mountain.

See also

References

External links

Unincorporated communities in San Diego County, California
Unincorporated communities in California